Slumkey Island is the largest island of the group lying east of Tupman Island, Pitt Islands, in the Biscoe Islands, Antarctica. It is separated from neighbouring Kereka Island to the east-northeast by an 80 m wide passage.

The island was first accurately shown on an Argentine government chart of 1957. Named by the United Kingdom Antarctic Place-Names Committee (UK-APC) in 1959 after the Honorable Samuel Slumkey, a character in Charles Dickens' Pickwick Papers.

See also 
 List of Antarctic and sub-Antarctic islands

Islands of the Biscoe Islands